Gundbach is a river of Hesse, Germany. At its confluence with the Geräthsbach west of Mörfelden-Walldorf, the Schwarzbach is formed.

See also
List of rivers of Hesse

References

Rivers of Hesse
Rivers of Germany